The 1948 South Australian 100 was a motor race staged at the Lobethal Circuit in South Australia on 1 January 1948. It was contested as a handicap race with the slowest cars starting first and the fastest cars last. The race was staged over 12 laps, a total distance of 105 miles. It was open to cars of any engine size.

The race, which was the second South Australian 100 to be held at Lobethal, was won by Jim Gullan driving a Ballot Oldsmobile.

Results

Notes
 Weather: Cool and cloudy 
 Attendance: 10,000
 Race distance: 12 laps, 105 miles
 Number of starters: 21
 Number of classified finishers: 13
 Fastest time: Granton Harrison, 79m 49s
 Fastest Lap: Doug Whiteford, 6m 7s (88 m.p.h.)
 Teams Prize: Harvey, Hamilton & Ohlmeyer

References

South Australian 100
Motorsport at Lobethal